In measure-theoretic analysis and related branches of mathematics, Lebesgue–Stieltjes integration generalizes both Riemann–Stieltjes and Lebesgue integration, preserving the many advantages of the former in a more general measure-theoretic framework.  The Lebesgue–Stieltjes integral is the ordinary Lebesgue integral with respect to a measure known as the Lebesgue–Stieltjes measure, which may be associated to any function of bounded variation on the real line.  The Lebesgue–Stieltjes measure is a regular Borel measure, and conversely every regular Borel measure on the real line is of this kind.

Lebesgue–Stieltjes integrals, named for Henri Leon Lebesgue and Thomas Joannes Stieltjes, are also known as Lebesgue–Radon integrals or just Radon integrals, after Johann Radon, to whom much of the theory is due.  They find common application in probability and stochastic processes, and in certain branches of analysis including potential theory.

Definition
The Lebesgue–Stieltjes integral

is defined when    is Borel-measurable

The measure  arises from an outer measure (in fact, a metric outer measure) given by

The Lebesgue–Stieltjes integral

If  is non-increasing, then define

the latter integral being defined by the preceding construction.

where  is the total variation

where the latter two integrals are well-defined by the preceding construction.

Daniell integral
An alternative approach  is to define the Lebesgue–Stieltjes integral as the Daniell integral that extends the usual Riemann–Stieltjes integral.

for all continuous functions . This functional can then be extended to the class of all non-negative functions by setting

For Borel measurable functions, one has

The outer measure  is defined via

Integrators of bounded variation are handled as above by decomposing into positive and negative variations.

Example

This notion is quite useful for various applications: for example, in muddy terrain the speed in which a person can move may depend on how deep the mud is. The concept of extremal length uses this notion of the -length of curves and is useful in the study of conformal mappings.

Integration by parts
A function  is said to be "regular" at a point  if the right and left hand limits  and  exist, and the function takes at  the average value

Complex-valued functions may be used as well.

An alternative result, of significant importance in the theory of stochastic calculus is the following.

where . This result can be seen as a precursor to Itô's lemma, and is of use in the general theory of stochastic integration. (The earlier result can then be seen as a result pertaining to the Stratonovich integral.)

Related concepts

Lebesgue integration

Riemann–Stieltjes integration and probability theory

for the Lebesgue–Stieltjes integral, letting the measure  remain implicit. This is particularly common in probability theory when  is the cumulative distribution function of a real-valued random variable , in which case 

(See the article on Riemann–Stieltjes integration for more detail on dealing with such cases.)

Notes

References

.
Saks, Stanisław (1937) Theory of the Integral.
Shilov, G. E., and Gurevich, B. L., 1978. Integral, Measure, and Derivative: A Unified Approach, Richard A. Silverman, trans. Dover Publications. .

Definitions of mathematical integration